Erin Woods is a residential neighbourhood in the southeast quadrant of Calgary, Alberta. It is located at the eastern edge of the city and is bounded to the east by 52 Street E, to the south by Peigan Trail and to the north and west by the Canadian National Railway tracks.

The area was annexed by the City of Calgary in 1961, and Erin Woods was established in 1981. It is represented in the Calgary City Council by the Ward 9 councillor.

The postal code in this area is T2B.

Demographics

Residents in this community had a median household income of $56,123 in 2000, and there were 20.4% low income residents living in the neighbourhood. As of 2000, 20.3% of the residents were immigrants. A proportion of 0.5% of the buildings were condominiums or apartments, and 20.5% of the housing was used for renting.

Education
The community is served by Erin Woods Elementary public school.

After elementary school, most students tend to proceed to other schools within the neighboring communities of Forest Lawn and Dover.

See also
List of neighbourhoods in Calgary

References

External links
Erin Woods Community Association

Neighbourhoods in Calgary